Waleed Jassem al-Alwani, also known by the nom de guerre Abu Ahmad al-Alwani, is a senior commander in the Islamic State of Iraq and the Levant (ISIL) and a prominent member of its military council. He was a former member of the Iraqi Army under Saddam Hussein.

Reports circulated in February 2015 in British tabloids that Al-Alwani was killed in an air strike. However, his death was never confirmed by the U.S. or the Islamic State and later reports named Alwani as a "very senior officer" in ISIS.

On 27 December 2015, after clearing IS from large parts of the city, the Iraqi Interior Ministry claimed that it had killed al-Alwani. A well-placed observer, claimed in early 2016 that al-Alwani was indeed dead, and had been replaced by Abu Umar al Hadithi, about whom nothing is known.

References

Islamic State of Iraq and the Levant members from Iraq
Iraqi Ground Forces officers
1972 births
2015 deaths